André Édouard Émile Hovelacque (29 March 1880, 7th arrondissement of Paris – 19 July 1939, Paris) was a 20th-century French anatomist who particularly studied the anatomy of the peripheral nervous system.

The son of Abel Hovelacque, he married Madeleine Lévi Alvarès in 1911, herself a physician and great grand niece of David Lévi Alvarès.

Works

References

External links 
 Article Hovelacque on Anatomicum.org, with black and white photographs.

French anatomists
20th-century French physicians
1880 births
Scientists from Paris
1939 deaths